Peter Salentine (January 14, 1829 – January 6, 1884) was an American hardware dealer and politician.

Born in Germany, Salentine emigrated to the United States and settled in Milwaukee, Wisconsin Territory in 1847. He also lived in California for five years before returning to Milwaukee, Wisconsin. Salentine was a hardware dealer in Milwaukee. He served on the Milwaukee Common Council and was a Democrat. In 1876, Salentine was elected to the Wisconsin State Assembly. However, Henry Fink successfully contested the election results in 1877. In 1884, Salentine committed suicide in Milwaukee, Wisconsin.

Notes

1829 births
1884 deaths
German emigrants to the United States
Politicians from Milwaukee
Businesspeople from Wisconsin
Milwaukee Common Council members
Suicides in Wisconsin
American politicians who committed suicide
19th-century American politicians
19th-century American businesspeople
Democratic Party members of the Wisconsin State Assembly